Aytugan-Durasovo (Aytuğan-Durasov) is a rural locality (a village) in Tenyayevsky Selsoviet, Fyodorovsky District, Bashkortostan, Russia. The population was 38 as of 2010. There are 3 streets.

Geography 
Aytugan-Durasovo is located 14 km northwest of Fyodorovka (the district's administrative centre) by road. Verkhnyaya Mityukovka is the nearest rural locality.

References 

Rural localities in Fyodorovsky District